Jacob Guntlack (1744–1771) was a notorious Swedish thief and impostor. He began his thievery in Sweden and Finland at age fifteen; he was a famous criminal by the time he was executed in Stockholm in front of thousands of spectators. His memoirs, entitled Den uti Smedjegårds-häktet nu fängslade ryktbare bedragaren och tjufwen Jacob Guntlacks lefwernes-beskrifning, af honom sjelf författad, were published the same year, either written by himself in prison, or after interviews in prison.

References
 Gunnar W. Lundberg; Stortjuven Jacob Guntlack: En svensk Cartouche .

1744 births
1771 deaths
Executed Swedish people
People executed by Sweden by hanging
18th-century Swedish criminals
18th-century executions by Sweden
Age of Liberty people